Carolina Raquel Duer (born 5 August 1978) is an Argentine boxer and former world champion.

She formerly held the International Boxing Federation (IBF) bantamweight title, the World Boxing Organization (WBO) bantamweight, and earlier the WBO super flyweight championship. Her record as of January 2018 was 20–6–2.

Early life and personal
Duer was born 5 August 1978, in Buenos Aires, Argentina.  She is the daughter of Syrian immigrants.

She is Jewish, attended a Jewish day school and Maccabi club, and celebrated her Bat Mitzvah in the Iona Hebrew Center, a Conservative synagogue.  She attended the Jaim Najman Bialik Primary School in Buenos Aires.

Boxing career
Duer won 19 of 20 fights as an amateur, and turned pro in 2007.

Duer became the WBO world super flyweight champion (fighters weighing 112 pounds to 115 pounds) in December 2010, and defended that title six times.

She won the WBO world bantamweight title in July 2013, and in July 2014, Duer defeated Ana Maria Lozano of Venezuela by unanimous decision in Lanus, Argentina, in her second defense of the crown in the bantamweight 115- to 118-pound class.  Her record as of September 2014 was 17–3–1.

She is the eighth Argentine woman to hold a WBO boxing championship, and the first Jewish one.

On August 26, 2016, and after a pause in her career due to her maternity, Duer won for the third time the IBF world bantamweight after defeating the Brazilian boxer Aline Scaranello by technical knockout. She lost the title in her first defense, to María Cecilia Román, by split decision.

Television

In 2013 Duer took part in the reality TV show Celebrity Splash! (Argentina), which teaches celebrities the art of diving.

Duer began to announce boxing in 2014 on National Public Television.

Professional boxing record

See also
List of select Jewish boxers

References

External links

Carolina Duer pre-fight interview; Titulo Mundial Femenino Supermosca OMB - WBO world female super flyweight title (Spanish), 11 November 2011
Carolina Duer post Victoria Milena Tronto - Interview Ring Side (Spanish), 3 March 2012

 

Promoted to full champion

1978 births
Living people
Argentine Sephardi Jews
Jewish Argentine sportspeople
Argentine women boxers
Boxers from Buenos Aires
World Boxing Organization champions
International Boxing Federation champions
World bantamweight boxing champions
World super-flyweight boxing champions
Jewish boxers
Argentine people of Syrian-Jewish descent
Sephardi Conservative Jews
The Challenge (TV series) contestants